Joseph-Arthur Jean,  (February 7, 1890 – July 18, 1973) was a Canadian politician.

Born in St-Philippe-de-Néri, Quebec, he was first elected to the House of Commons of Canada representing the Quebec riding of Maisonneuve in a 1932 by-election. A Liberal, he was re-elected in 1935, 1940, 1945, and 1949 representing the riding of Mercier. From 1943 to 1945, he was the Parliamentary Assistant to the Minister of Justice and Attorney General. From 1945 to 1949, he was the Solicitor General of Canada.

References
 

1890 births
1973 deaths
Liberal Party of Canada MPs
Members of the House of Commons of Canada from Quebec
Members of the King's Privy Council for Canada
Solicitors General of Canada
Canadian King's Counsel